Lawrence Technological University (LTU) (Lawrence Tech) is a private university in Southfield, Michigan. It was founded in 1932 in Highland Park, Michigan, as the Lawrence Institute of Technology (LIT) by Russell E. Lawrence. The campus also includes the Frank Lloyd Wright designed Affleck House in Bloomfield Hills.

The university offers undergraduate, masters, and doctoral programs in science, technology, engineering, architecture and design, and mathematics through its four colleges: Architecture and Design, Arts and Sciences, Business and Information Technology, and Engineering.

History 
In 1932, at the height of the Great Depression, Lawrence Tech's founding president Russell E. Lawrence envisioned a new model of higher education that could serve both traditional students as well as working adults, and combined a teaching philosophy espousing both theory and practice.

Lawrence believed engineering and technological achievements would be what would spur economic recovery, both for the region and the nation. Henry and Edsel Ford agreed to lease their former Henry Ford Trade School building, a part of their Model-T assembly complex in Highland Park, to the new university, which began operations with a few hundred students. The institution's enrollment dropped during World War II but surged immediately thereafter as veterans enjoyed the education benefits of the G.I. Bill.

In 1955, Lawrence Institute of Technology (LIT) moved to a campus in then rural Southfield. Since the university was founded as an engineering school, it is fitting that the first building constructed on the Southfield campus was the Engineering building. The campus master plan was created by professor Earl W. Pellerin, who also led the teams that designed the Architecture and Science Buildings, the university's first residence hall on Ten Mile Road, University Housing-South, and what was originally the president's residence on nearby Circle Drive.

LIT began offering multiple master's degree programs through its colleges, and in recognition of these post-baccalaureate programs LIT changed it name to Lawrence Technological University (LTU) on 1 January 1989.

LTU continued its transformation from a primarily commuter institution to offering a full campus life with the construction of more residence halls—Donley Hall, Reuss Hall, and the award-winning East Residence Hall, the latter for all first-year students. The university now has the capacity for more than 1,000 residential students.

A marker designating the college as a Michigan Historic Site was erected by the Michigan Historical Commission in 1986. The inscription reads:

 Lawrence Tech was chartered in 1932 by the Lawrence brothers, Russell E. and E. George. The college was located in Highland Park on Woodward Avenue until 1955, when the first building opened on this campus. Lawrence Tech, founded as an undergraduate college of engineering, later added programs in architecture, management, arts and science, and various technological fields. The college pioneered in scheduling evening programs for working students and in 1935 developed the four-quarter academic calendar. "Theory and Practice" has been the motto of the college since its founding. Application of classroom theories to real situations involving the community or Michigan industries has been its goal. Lawrence Institute of Technology is a nonprofit independent college.

Academics

Admissions

Undergraduate 

Lawrence Tech is considered "selective" by U.S. News & World Report. For the Class of 2025 (enrolled fall 2021), Lawrence Tech received 2,641 applications and accepted 2,141 (81.1%). Of those accepted, 475 enrolled, a yield rate (the percentage of accepted students who choose to attend the university) of 22.2%. Lawrence Tech's freshman retention rate is 72.95%, with 58.35% going on to graduate within six years.

The enrolled first-year class of 2025 had the following standardized test scores: the middle 50% range (25th percentile-75th percentile) of SAT scores was 1040–1250, while the middle 50% range of ACT scores was 22–28.

Academic divisions

Lawrence Technological University is a member of the Association of Independent Technological Universities (AITU). Lawrence Technological University is one out of only 13 doctoral, technological, private universities in the US; from more than 6000 institutions of higher education in the country. The university is organized into four Colleges: Architecture and Design, Arts and Sciences, Business and Information Technology, and Engineering.

In 1950, associate degree programs were added to LTU's baccalaureate programs and in 1952, what is today the College of Business and Information Technology was established. LTU started offering multiple master's degree programs from the early 1990s. Master's degree programs in business were created in 1989, engineering in 1990, Architecture in 1993 and arts and sciences in 1997. Its most popular undergraduate majors, in terms of 2021 graduates, were:
Mechanical Engineering (68)
Architectural and Building Sciences/Technology (46)
Electrical and Electronics Engineering (43)
Computer Science (41)

The College of Business and Information Technology is one of only 5 percent of the world's 16,000 institutions of higher learning offering business degrees to earn accreditation from AACSB International, the Association to Advance Collegiate Schools of Business.

Rankings
 In its 2023 rankings, U.S. News & World Report ranked Lawrence Tech as tied for #33 in "Regional Universities Midwest", a move up from #37 the prior two years. LTU also made U.S. News’ Best Value Colleges, Best Colleges for Veterans, and Top Performers for Social Mobility lists among its peer group of Midwestern universities.
 LTU ranks #95 on Niche's list of "Best for Design" colleges in America and #7 in Best Value Colleges in Michigan.
 LTU was also named to Forbes magazine's list of America's Top Colleges in August 2022.

Athletics 

The Lawrence Tech athletic teams are called the Blue Devils. The university is a member of the National Association of Intercollegiate Athletics (NAIA), primarily competing in the Wolverine–Hoosier Athletic Conference (WHAC) for most of its sports since the 2012–13 academic year; while the university's second men's ice hockey team is a member of the American Collegiate Hockey Association (ACHA) at the Division III level as a member of the Michigan Collegiate Hockey Conference (MCHC); and its football team competes in the Mideast League of the Mid-States Football Association (MSFA). The Blue Devils previously competed as an NAIA Independent within the Association of Independent Institutions (AII) during the 2011–12 school year (when the school re-instated back its athletics program).

Lawrence Tech competes in 26 intercollegiate varsity sports: Men's sports include baseball, basketball, bowling, cross country, football, golf, ice hockey (D-I and D-III), lacrosse, soccer, tennis, track & field (indoor and outdoor) and volleyball; while women's sports include basketball, bowling, cross country, golf, ice hockey, lacrosse, soccer, softball, tennis, track & field (indoor and outdoor) and volleyball.

History 
Lawrence Tech fielded athletic teams throughout its history from 1930 to 1962. The 1950–51 men's basketball team played the 1951 National Invitation Tournament, held at Madison Square Garden in New York.
Lawrence Tech was defeated by Dayton, 71–77 in the opening round of the tournament. Blaine Denning, an alumnus from the 1951 team, went on to play professional basketball with the Baltimore Bullets of the NBA.

Lawrence Tech reinstated athletic programs in 2011 and joined the NAIA. Men's soccer and bowling, along with women's volleyball, joined the already established men's ice hockey team for the university's athletic offerings during the 2011–12 academic year. During its fifth season in the NAIA, the university fielded teams in men's baseball, basketball, bowling, cross country, golf, hockey, volleyball, lacrosse, soccer and tennis, and women's basketball, bowling, cross country, golf, lacrosse, soccer, softball, tennis and volleyball.

Thanks to a $1 million gift from an anonymous donor, during the summer of 2016 Lawrence Tech constructed an AstroTurf surface athletic field at the Point, the part of campus at the intersection of Northwestern Highway and 10 Mile Road. LTU's men's and women's soccer and lacrosse teams began playing on this field in August 2016. The project also includes a 40-car parking lot. In the summer of 2018, lighting for night games, a new scoreboard with a video replay display, temporary seating for 2,000 fans and a press box were constructed in preparation for the inaugural 2018 season of LTU's football team. The first football game, held Sept. 1, 2018, drew an overflow crowd of more than 3,800 fans. Future plans for the site include permanent stadium seating for 4,000 fans, a two-story team building with locker rooms, a weight room, and offices for trainers and coaches, and a concession and restroom building.

In January 2017, Lawrence Tech announced that it would resume intercollegiate football competition, after a hiatus of more than 70 years dating back to just after World War II. The university has admitted two recruiting classes of about 90 student-athletes for a team that competed as an independent squad in the fall of 2018, and which will begin playing a full varsity schedule in the Mid-States Football Association of the NAIA in the fall of 2019. LTU hired Jeff Duvendeck, former head coach at Culver-Stockton (Mo.) College and a former assistant at Michigan State University, Northern Michigan University, Michigan Technological University, Grand Valley State University, and Tiffin (Ohio) University, as its head coach. The Blue Devils finished 5–3 in their abbreviated first season, and attracted nearly 4,000 fans to their first game on Sept. 1, 2018. The 2021 LTU football squad finished 7-4 overall, 3–4 in the Mid-States Football Association.

In 2021, the university added more teams, including eSports, women's hockey, cheerleading and men's volleyball, and adding to existing programs in women's bowling and track and field. LTU now supports over 30 varsity men's and women's teams in baseball, basketball, bowling, cross country, eSports, football, golf, ice hockey, lacrosse, soccer, softball, tennis, track and field, and volleyball—along with a pep band, a marching band, and cheer and dance teams.

Student life

Student organizations 
On campus extracurricular activities include leadership opportunities and more than 60 student clubs and organizations. Student Government represents all organizations on campus. The university generally allows new student clubs in any interest area if they are supported by a student petition with at least 30 signatures.

Fraternities and sororities 
The university is also home to chapters of fraternities, including Alpha Sigma Phi, Theta Tau, Sigma Pi, Sigma Phi Epsilon, Phi Kappa Upsilon, and Phi Beta Sigma. The sororities represented on campus include Chi Omega Rho, Delta Tau Sigma, Delta Phi Epsilon, Kappa Beta Gamma, and Delta Sigma Theta.

Notable alumni
 Steven A. Ballmer, while still simultaneously enrolled in high school, participated in Lawrence Tech's Summer Science Institute, then spent a year at the university, excelling in six of Lawrence Tech's top mathematics classes. Ballmer is the former CEO of Microsoft and current owner of the NBA's Los Angeles Clippers.
 John Z. DeLorean, B.S. Industrial engineering 1948 – Former GM executive who created the first muscle car and an American businessman who founded the DeLorean Motor Company based in Northern Ireland.
 Harvey Ferrero, B.S. Architectural Engineering 1955 - American architect, architectural illustration expert, the founder of Ferrero Architects, and a former adjunct professor of Lawrence Technological University.
 Alfred Taubman
 Lewis Veraldi, B.S. Mechanical Engineering 1948
 Sue Allor, MBA, is an American politician from Michigan. A Republican, Allor has been a member of the Michigan House of Representatives since 2017, elected from District 106.
 Rosemary Bayer, MBA 2003, is an American politician from Michigan and is currently a Michigan senator representing District 12.

Photo gallery

See also 
 Association of Independent Technological Universities

References

External links

 Official website
 Official athletics website

 
Private universities and colleges in Michigan
Southfield, Michigan
Educational institutions established in 1932
Universities and colleges in Oakland County, Michigan
Technological universities in the United States
1932 establishments in Michigan